Waco, the Big Lie is a 1993 American documentary film directed by Linda Thompson that presents video-based analysis regarding the Waco siege.  The first film made about the Waco siege, Waco, the Big Lie gained significant notoriety when it was viewed during the trial of American domestic terrorist Timothy McVeigh.  As part of the defense, McVeigh's lawyers showed Waco, the Big Lie to the jury.

In 1994, the film was followed by a feature-length sequel titled Waco II, the Big Lie Continues, aimed at addressing criticisms of the original.

Thompson's films made a number of controversial allegations, the most famous of which was her claim that footage of an armored vehicle breaking through the outer walls of the compound showed a flamethrower attached to the vehicle, setting fire to the building. As a response to Thompson, filmmaker Michael McNulty released footage to support his counter-claim that the appearance of light was a reflection on aluminized insulation that was torn from the wall and snagged on the vehicle. McNulty accused Thompson of "creative editing" in his film Waco: An Apparent Deviation. Thompson worked from a VHS copy of the surveillance tape; McNulty was given access to a beta original. However, McNulty in turn was later accused of having digitally altered his footage, an allegation he denied.

John Young of the Waco Tribune-Herald criticized the film, questioning the evidence behind Thompson's claims.

References

External links
 

1993 films
1990s English-language films
American documentary films
Waco siege
Documentary films about conspiracy theories
Films about religious violence in the United States
1990s American films